Nina George (born 30 August 1973) is a German writer, best known as the author of The Little Paris Bookshop, an international bestseller that has been translated into more than 28 languages , and sold in more than 500.000 copies. She has published 26 books (novels, mysteries and non-fiction) as well as over hundred short stories and more than 600 columns. George has worked as a cop reporter, columnist and managing editor for a wide range of publications, including Hamburger Abendblatt, Die Welt, Der Hamburger, as well as TV Movie and Federwelt.

George writes also under three pen names. She writes non-fiction about issues of love, sexuality and eroticism, under the pseudonym Anne West. Under her married name Nina Kramer she wrote a thriller in 2008. She also wrote detective novels with her husband and co-writer Jo Kramer, their pseudonym being Jean Bagnol.

In 2012 and 2013 she won the DeLiA and the Glauser Prize. Her first bestselling novel was The Little Paris Bookshop (first published in German as Das Lavendelzimmer on May 2, 2013). She moved to Concarneau in France, where she now lives with her husband Jo Kramer.

George is a member of the administrative board of the Collective Management Organisation VG Wort. She is chairwoman of the VG-Wort ‘e-Book’ working  group.

Life and work
Nina George was born in Bielefeld. She dropped out of school before finishing high school and worked in various catering establishments from the age of fourteen. She began in 1993 writing as a freelance journalist and columnist for magazines like Cosmopolitan, Penthouse, TV Movie, and Frau im Trend. In 1997, she wrote the book Good girls do it in bed, bad ones everywhere under the pseudonym Anne West. She lived in Hamburg. In 2008, she appeared under the name Nina Kramer in 'Thriller A Life Without Me' about women's reproductive health.

George is Member to PEN, Das Syndikat (association of German-language crime writers), the Association of German Authors (VS), the Hamburg Authors’ Association (HAV), BücherFrauen (Women in Publishing), the IACW/AIEP (International Association of Crime Writers), the GEDOK (Association of female artists in Germany), PRO QUOTE and Lean In. Nina George sits on the board of the Three Seas Writers’ and Translators’ Council (TSWTC), whose members come from 16 different countries.

In 2014, she delivered the keynote address in Berlin at the German Writer’s Conference to 140 attending writers.

Nina George teaches writing at Literaturbüro Unna, Alsterdamm Kunstschule, Wilhelmsburger Honigfabrik, where she coaches young people, adults and professional authors.

After her father's death, she wrote semi-autobiographical novel The Little Paris Bookshop, which talks about bibliotherapy, the fear of death and how this fear holds us back from living life to the fullest, the mourning process, and travel on river boat from Paris in the Canal latéral à la Loire, via Literary Sanary, to the south of Provence. There are meta-literary references to many famous literary works and authors in her novel, including Erich Kästner's idea of a list of books as remedies for different afflictions. At the end there's an appendix where she offers an alphabetical list of books and what she recommends them for, starting with The Hitchhiker's Guide to the Galaxy by Douglas Adams. She finds inspiration for writing in reading Jon Kalman Stefansson, Anna Gavalda, Dominique Manotti, Erica Jong, and Dorothea Brande.

Works

Books as Nina George
 2019 The Book of Dreams, a novel
 2017 The Little Breton Bistro, a novel
 2013 The Little Paris Bookshop, a novel, Crown, 
 2010 The Moon Player, Knaur,  - awarded the Delia 2011 - literary prize for the best German romance of the previous year by the Friends of German romance literature
 2008 How the Hell, Fischer, Frankfurt,  .
 2005 The Vocabulary of Men, Lappan,  .
 2003 The Way of the Warrior, Droemer Knaur,  .
 2003 Jack, Queen, Checked, Death, Hamburger Abendblatt,  .
 2001 No Sex, No Beer and Lots of Dead, Droemer Knaur,  .

Books as Anne West
 2009 What Women Dream and How To Get It, Droemer Knaur,  
 2009 Sex for advanced skiers, Droemer Knaur, 
 2009 Feeling - the feeling, Droemer Knaur, 
 2009 Absolute Sex, Droemer Knaur, 
 2007 Sex Goddesses Manual, Droemer Knaur, 
 2006 One Day Sex, Knaur, 
 2006 The Venus Effect, Droemer Knaur, 
 2005 First Aid For Those in Love, Droemer Knaur, 
 2004 Dirty Stories, Droemer Knaur, 
 2003 Kamasutra Without Hernia, as co-author. Droemer Knaur, 
 2003 Why Men Are So Quick and Women Just Pretend, Droemer Knaur, 
 1998 Good Girls Do It in Bed - Bad Ones Everywhere, Droemer Knaur,

Books as Jean Bagnol
Commissaire Mazan and the blind angel, Droemer Knaur, 2015 
Commissaire Mazan and the heirs of the Marquis, Droemer Knaur, 2013

References

External links 
  of Nina George
 Interview with Nina George

1973 births
Living people
German women novelists
21st-century German novelists
21st-century German women writers
German women short story writers
German columnists
German women columnists
Writers from Bielefeld
German women journalists
21st-century short story writers